Henry Arthur Wallop Fellowes (29 October 1799 – 17 February 1847) was an English Whig and Liberal politician who sat in the House of Commons from 1831 to 1835

Fellowes was born at Eggesford, Devon, the son of Newton Fellowes, 4th Earl of Portsmouth and his first wife Frances Ferrard, daughter of the Rev. Castel Ferrard. He was educated at Eton College and was admitted to Trinity College, Cambridge on 19 June 1816. He migrated to Trinity Hall, Cambridge on 23 October 1818 and was awarded MA in 1820.

At the 1831 general election Fellowes was elected Member of Parliament for Andover. He held the seat until 1835.

Fellowes died, unmarried, at the age of 47.

References

External links

1799 births
1847 deaths
Members of the Parliament of the United Kingdom for English constituencies
UK MPs 1831–1832
UK MPs 1832–1835
Whig (British political party) MPs for English constituencies
People educated at Eton College
Alumni of Trinity Hall, Cambridge
People from Mid Devon District
Henry